Ctenoplusia furcifera is a moth of the family Noctuidae. It is found in south-east Asia and the Pacific, including India, Taiwan, Australia and New Guinea.

External links
Australian Faunal Directory

Moths of Australia
Plusiinae
Moths of Asia
Moths described in 1858